Shen Buhai (c. 400c. 337) was a Chinese essayist, philosopher, and politician. He served as Chancellor of the Han state under Marquis Zhao of Han for fifteen years, from 354 BC to 337 BC. A contemporary of syncretist Shi Jiao and Legalist Shang Yang, he was born in the State of Zheng, and was likely a minor official there. After Han conquered Zheng in 375 BC, he rose up in the ranks of the Han officialdom, dividing up its territories and successfully reforming it. Though not dealing in penal law himself, his administrative innovations would be incorporated into "Chinese Legalist" statecraft by Han Fei, his most famous successor, and Shen Buhai's book most resembles the Han Feizi (though more conciliatory). He died of natural causes while in office.

Though Chinese administration cannot be traced to any one individual, emphasizing a merit system figures like 4th century BC reformer Shen Buhai may have had more influence than any other, and might be considered its founder, if not valuable as a rare pre-modern example of abstract theory of administration. Sinologist Herrlee G. Creel sees in Shen Buhai the "seeds of the civil service examination", while the correlation between Shen's conception of the inactive (Wu-wei) ruler and the handling of claims and titles likely informed the Taoist conception of the formless Tao (name that cannot be named) that "gives rise to the ten thousand things." He is attributed the dictum "The Sage ruler relies on standards and does not rely on wisdom; he relies on technique, not on persuasions."

Shenzi
Shen was known for his cryptic writing style. Because the writings attributed to him appear to be pre-Han dynasty, he is credited with writing a now extinct two chapter text, the Shenzi, which is concerned almost exclusively with the philosophy of governmental administration. In 141 BC, under the influence of Confucians, the reign of Emperor Wu of Han saw Shen Buhai's name was listed with other legalist thinkers whose ideas were officially banned from the government; from that point on, scholarship relating to Shen's ideas went into a steep decline, despite continued use of his foundational ideas in administration (much of which, consisting of skill and report checking, would be unavoidable).

Widely read in Han times, in comparison to the still-complete Han Feizi the Shenzi was listed as lost by the Liang dynasty (502-556). Appearing again in the bibliographies of both Tang histories, it's only traces remain as quotes in surviving texts in Qunshu Zhiyao, compiled in 631, and Yilin, compiled around 786. During the Qing Dynasty, three major attempts were made to reconstruct the contents of the work, the last mention occurring in 1616, and in a library catalogue from 1700. Its fragments were re-assembled by Sinologist Herrlee G. Creel in Shen Pu-Hai: A Chinese Political Philosopher of the Fourth Century B. C.

Philosophy

The Huainanzi says that when Shen Buhai lived, the officials of the state of Han were at cross-purposes and did not know what practices to follow. Though not unifying the laws as Shang Yang did, what Shen appears to have realized is that the "methods for the control of a bureaucracy" could not be mixed with the survivals of feudal government, or staffed merely by "getting together a group of 'good men'", but rather must be men qualified in their jobs. Unlike Shang Yang, Shen therefore emphasizes the importance of selecting able officials as much as Confucius did, but insists on "constant vigilance over their performance", never mentioning virtue. In comparison with Han Fei on the other hand his system required a strong ruler at the center, emphasizing that he trust no one minister.

Ideally, Shen Buhai's ruler had the widest possible sovereignty, was intelligent (if not a sage), had to make all crucial decisions himself, and had unlimited control of the bureaucracy - over which, in contrast to Shang Yang, he is simply the head. Championing Fa (法 "method"), Shen believed that the greatest threat to a ruler's power came from within, and unlike Han Fei, never preaches to his ministers about duty or loyalty. He insisted that the ruler must be fully informed on the state of his realm, but couldn't afford to get caught up in details and was advised to listen to no one - and does not, as Sinologist Herrlee G. Creel says, have the time to do so. The way to see and hear independently is by grouping particulars into categories through mechanical or operational decision making (Fa or "method").

Shen's doctrines, posthumously referred to by Han Fei as Shu or Techniques (a term Shen does not appear to have used), are described as concerned almost exclusively with the "ruler's role and the methods by which he may control a bureaucracy", that is, its management and personnel control: the selection of capable ministers, their performance, the monopolization of power, and the control of and power relations between ruler and minister which he characterized as Wu Wei. They can therefore easily be considered the most crucial element in controlling a bureaucracy.

More specifically, Shen Buhai's  methods (Fa) focused on "scrutinizing achievement and on that ground alone to give rewards, and to bestow office solely on the basis of ability". Liu Xiang wrote that Shen Buhai advised the ruler of men use technique (shu) rather than punishment, relying on persuasion to supervise and hold responsible, though very strictly. Liu considered Shen's "principal tenet" to be (Xing-Ming 刑名). Representing equally applied checks against the power of officials, Xing-Ming seeks the right person for the job through the examination of skill, achievement and (more rarely) seniority.

Personnel selection 
Shen Buhai's personnel control, or rectification of names (such as titles) worked through "strict performance control"(Hansen), correlating performance and posts (Xing or Shih and Ming). It would become a central tenet of both "Legalist" statecraft and its Taoistic derivatives. The correlation between Wu-wei and Xing-ming may have informed the Taoist conception of the formless Tao that "gives rise to the ten thousand things."

In the Han Dynasty secretaries of government who had charge of the records of decisions in criminal matters were called Xing-Ming, a term used by Han Fei, which Sima Qian (145 or 135 – 86 BC) and Liu Xiang (77 BC – 6 BC) attributed to the doctrine of Shen Buhai(400 BC – c. 337 BC). Liu Xiang goes as far as to define Shen Buhai's doctrine as Xing-Ming. Shen actually used an older, more philosophically common equivalent, ming-shih, linking the "Legalist doctrine of names" with the name and reality (ming shih) debates of the school of names. Such discussions are also prominent in the Han Feizi.

Sima Qian and Liu Xiang define Xing-Ming as "holding actual outcome accountable to Ming". Ming sometimes has the sense of speech—so as to compare the statements of an aspiring officer with the reality of his actions—or reputation, again compared with real conduct (xing "form" or shih "reality"). Rather than having to look for "good" men, Xing-Ming (or ming-shih) can seek the right man for a particular post, though doing so implies a total organizational knowledge of the regime. More simply though, it can allow ministers to come forward with proposals of specific cost and time frame, leaving their definition to competing ministers—the doctrine favored by Han Fei. Preferring exactness, it combats the tendency to promise too much; the correct articulation of Ming is considered crucial to the realization of projects.

The logician Deng Xi (died 501 BCE) is cited by Liu Xiang for the origin of the principle of Xing-Ming. Serving as a minor official in the state of Zheng, he is reported to have drawn up a code of penal laws. Associated with litigation, he is said to have argued for the permissibility of contradictory propositions, likely engaging in hair-splitting debates on the interpretation of laws, legal principles and definitions.

Shen Buhai solves this through Wu wei, or not getting involved, making an official's words his own responsibility. Shen Buhai says, "The ruler controls the policy, the ministers manage affairs. To speak ten times and ten times be right, to act a hundred times and a hundred times succeed - this is the business of one who serves another as minister; it is the not the way to rule." Noting all the details of a claim and then attempting to objectively compare them with his achievements through passive mindfulness (the "method of yin"), Shen Buhai's ruler neither adds to nor detracts from anything, giving names (titles/offices) on the basis of claim.

Shen supported reward for visible results, using ming-shih for investigation and appointment, but the legal system of Han was apparently confused, prohibiting uniform reward and punishment. We have no basis to suppose that Shen advocated the doctrine of rewards and punishment (of Shang Yang, as Han Fei did), and Han Fei criticizes him for not unifying the laws.

Wu wei

Earlier modern scholars suggested that Shen's statecraft blended with Taoism. Rather, since the bulk of the Tao Te Ching appears to have been composed later, it might therefore be assumed that Shen influenced the Tao Te Ching. Lacking any metaphysical connotation, Shen used the term Wu wei to mean that the ruler, though vigilant, should not interfere with the duties of his ministers.

Following Shen, Han Fei strongly advocated Wu wei. During the Han dynasty up until the reign of Han Wudi, rulers confined their activity "chiefly to the appointment and dismissal of his high officials", a plainly "Legalist" practice inherited from the Qin dynasty. This "conception of the ruler's role as a supreme arbiter, who keeps the essential power firmly in his grasp" while leaving details to ministers, has a "deep influence on the theory and practice of Chinese monarchy."

Shen Buhai argued that if the government were organized and supervised relying on proper method (Fa), the ruler need do little—and must do little. Unlike "Legalists" Shang Yang and Han Fei, Shen did not consider the relationship between ruler and minister antagonistic necessarily. Apparently paraphrasing the Analects, Shen Buhai's statement that those near him will feel affection, while the far will yearn for him, stands in contrast to Han Fei, who considered the relationship between the ruler and ministers irreconcilable.

However, Shen still believed that the ruler's most able ministers are his greatest danger, and is convinced that it is impossible to make them loyal without techniques. Sinologist Herrlee G. Creel explains: "The ruler's subjects are so numerous, and so on alert to discover his weaknesses and get the better of him, that it is hopeless for him alone as one man to try to learn their characteristics and control them by his knowledge... the ruler must refrain from taking the initiative, and from making himself conspicuous--and therefore vulnerable--by taking any overt action."

Emphasizing the use of administrative methods (Fa) in secrecy, Shen Buhai portrays the ruler as putting up a front to hide his weaknesses and dependence on his advisers. Shen therefore advises the ruler to keep his own counsel, hide his motivations, and conceal his tracks in inaction, availing himself of an appearance of stupidity and insufficiency. Shen says:

Acting through administrative method (Fa), the ruler conceals his intentions, likes and dislikes, skills and opinions. Not acting himself, he can avoid being manipulated. The ruler plays no active role in governmental functions. He should not use his talent even if he has it. Not using his own skills, he is better able to secure the services of capable functionaries. Creel argues that not getting involved in details allowed Shen's ruler to "truly rule", because it leaves him free to supervise the government without interfering, maintaining his perspective. Seeing and hearing independently, the ruler is able to make decisions independently, and is, Shen says, able to rule the world thereby.

This Wu wei (or nonaction) might be said to end up the political theory of the "Legalists", if not becoming their general term for political strategy, playing a "crucial role in the promotion of the autocratic tradition of the Chinese polity." The (qualified) non-action of the ruler ensures his power and the stability of the polity.

Yin (passive mindfulness)
Adherence to the use of technique in governing requires the ruler not engage in any interference or subjective consideration. Sinologist John Makeham explains: "assessing words and deeds requires the ruler's dispassionate attention; (yin is) the skill or technique of making one's mind a tabula rasa, non-committaly taking note of all the details of a man's claims and then objectively comparing his achievements of the original claims."

A commentary to the Shiji cites a now-lost book as quoting Shen Buhai saying: "By employing (yin), 'passive mindfulness', in overseeing and keeping account of his vassals, accountability is deeply engraved." The Guanzi similarly says: "Yin is the way of non-action. Yin is neither to add to nor to detract from anything. To give something a name strictly on the basis of its form – this is the Method of yin." Yin also aimed at concealing the ruler's intentions, likes and opinions.

Legacy
The Shiji records Li Si as repeatedly recommending "supervising and holding responsible", which he attributed to Shen Buhai. A stele set up by Qin Shi Huang memorializes him as a sage that, taking charge of the government, established Xing-Ming - Shen Buhai and Han Fei's doctrine of personnel selection. The Shiji states that Emperor Wen of Han was "basically fond of Xing-Ming." The scholar Jia Yi advised Wen to teach his heir to use Shen Buhai's method, so as to be able to "supervise the functions of the many officials and understand the usages of government."  Two advisors to Wen's heir, Emperor Jing of Han were students of Xing-Ming, one passing the highest grade of examination, and admonished Jing for not using it on the feudal lords.

By the time of the civil service examination was put into place, Confucian influence saw outright discussion of Shen Buhai banned. However, the Emperor under which it was founded, Emperor Wu of Han, was both familiar with and favorable to Legalist ideas, and the civil service examination did not come into existence until its support by Gongsun Hong, who wrote a book on Xing-Ming. The Emperor Xuan of Han was still said by Liu Xiang to have been fond of reading Shen Buhai, using Xing-Ming to control his subordinates and devoting much time to legal cases. Zhuge Liang attached great importance to the works of Shen Buhai and Han Fei. Emperor Wen of Sui is recorded as having withdrawn his favour from the Confucians, giving it to "the group advocating Xing-Ming and authoritarian government".

Regarded as being in opposition to Confucians, as early as the Eastern Han its full and original meaning would be forgotten. Yet the writings of Dong Zhongshu discuss personnel testing and control in a manner sometimes hardly distinguishable from the Han Feizi. Like Shen Buhai, he dissuades against reliance upon punishments. As Confucianism ascended the term disappeared, though it appears in later dynasties.

References
Footnotes

Works cited
 Creel, Herrlee G., The Origins of Statecraft in China. 
 Creel, Herrlee G., Shen Pu-hai: A Chinese Political Philosopher of the Fourth Century B.C. 
 Duyvendak, J.J.L., The Book of Lord Shang: Translated From the Chinese with Notes by J.J.L. Duyvendak.
 
 Li, Shen, "Shenzi". Encyclopedia of China (Chinese History Edition), 1st ed.
 Pan, Fuen, "Shen Buhai". Encyclopedia of China (Philosophy Edition), 1st ed.
 Zhang, Guohua, "Shen Buhai". Encyclopedia of China (Law Edition), 1st ed.

External links
 Hong Kong University Philosophy Department, Shen Buhai

330s BC deaths
4th-century BC Chinese philosophers
Chinese reformers
Legalism (Chinese philosophy)
Han (state)
Philosophers from Henan
Politicians from Henan
Writers from Henan
Year of birth unknown
Zhou dynasty essayists
Zhou dynasty philosophers
Zhou dynasty politicians
Zheng (state)